Château de Bruzac is a ruined castle in Saint-Pierre-de-Côle, Dordogne, Nouvelle-Aquitaine, France.

Châteaux in Dordogne
Ruined castles in Nouvelle-Aquitaine
Monuments historiques of Dordogne